This is a complete listing of Women's National Basketball Association (WNBA) playoff series, grouped by franchise. Series featuring relocated and renamed teams are kept with their ultimate relocation franchises. Bolded years indicate wins. Years in italics indicate series in progress. Tables are sorted first by the number of series, then the number of wins, and then by year of first occurrence.

Atlanta Dream

Chicago Sky

Connecticut Sun

Dallas Wings

Indiana Fever

Las Vegas Aces

Los Angeles Sparks

Minnesota Lynx

New York Liberty

Phoenix Mercury

Seattle Storm

Washington Mystics

Defunct Teams

Cleveland Rockers

Charlotte Sting

Houston Comets

Miami Sol

Sacramento Monarchs

See also
Basketball
Women's National Basketball Association

References